Irene Ighodaro (16 May 1916 – 29 November 1995) was a Sierra Leone Creole physician and social reformer who was the first Sierra Leonean woman to qualify as a medical doctor. She was president of the Young Women's Christian Association of Nigeria. She was also the first President of the Medical Association of Nigerian Women.

Life
Ighodaro was born Irene Elizabeth Beatrice Wellesley-Cole in Freetown, Sierra Leone, one of seven children of engineer Wilfred Wellesley-Cole. Her elder brother was physician Robert Wellesley-Cole. She attended the Government Model School and graduated from the Annie Walsh Memorial School. She decided to become a physician after nursing her mother through a terminal illness. She received her M.B.B.S. from the University of Durham in England in 1945. She later married Samuel Ighodaro of Benin City with whom she had four children; Tony, Wilfred, Ayo, and Yinka. They moved to Nigeria, where he became a judge on the High Court of Midwestern Nigeria.

Ighodaro maintained a private medical practice and was a member of a number of western Nigerian medical advisory committees. She consulted the World Health Organization on child and maternal health and authored the book Baby's First Year. She also chaired the University of Benin Teaching Hospital's board of management and was a member of the YWCA World Executive Committee. She was made a Member of the Order of the British Empire (MBE) in 1958.

Ighodaro died on 29 November 1995.

References

Further reading
Crane, Louise. Ms. Africa: Profiles of Modern African Women. Philadelphia, PA: Lippincott, 1973.

1916 births
1995 deaths
Alumni of Durham University
Annie Walsh Memorial School alumni
Sierra Leone Creole people
20th-century Sierra Leonean physicians
American social reformers
Women physicians
Sierra Leonean emigrants to Nigeria
Nigerian women medical doctors
University of Benin (Nigeria) people
Sierra Leonean Christians
20th-century women physicians